Johann Philipp von Lamberg (Vienna, 25 May 1652 – Regensburg, 21 October 1712) was an Austrian Catholic cardinal and bishop.

Biography 
Johann Philipp von Lamberg was born in Vienna on 25 May 1652 and was baptized the following day. He was the uncle of Cardinal Joseph Dominik von Lamberg (1680–1761).

Having completed his studies in Vienna and Passau, he went to study in Siena where he obtained his doctorate in utroque iure (canon law and civil law) on 14 August 1673.

He personally took part in the war against the Turks and was an Austrian ambassador in several countries, including in Poland. Received the ecclesiastical tonsure and minor orders on 29 January 1668, he obtained the subdeacon on 13 September 1684 and finally the diaconate. He became a canon of the cathedrals of Passau, Salzburg and Olomouc. He was appointed Imperial Councilor.

Elected bishop of Passau from his own chapter on 25 May 1689, he was granted access to the office despite not yet having received the diaconate with a papal dispensation of 11 January 1690. At the same time, for his consecration as bishop, he was guaranteed the dispensation to be appointed to the episcopal see by a bishop and two abbots working together since on 14 January 1690 there were no bishops in the area who were not involved in other religious or territorial issues. Appointed royal commissioner in Regensburg, he was imperial plenipotentiary minister to the Diet of Regensburg.

Created cardinal priest in the consistory of 21 June 1700, he participated in the conclave that at the end of that same year elected Pope Clement XI. On 3 January 1701 he received the cardinal's purple and the title of San Silvestro in Capite. So he received from the Holy See the task of visiting the various Italian princes in the search for armies against France in the War of Spanish Succession. He became an adviser to the emperors Leopold I, Joseph I and Charles VI.

In his court of Passau he had as Kapellmeister Georg Muffat and Benedikt Anton Aufschnaiter.

He died on 21 October 1712 in the abbey of St Emmeram in Regensburg. His corpse, transported to Passau, was publicly displayed in the city cathedral and then buried in the chapel that he had himself erected in the cathedral cloister.

References 

18th-century Austrian cardinals
1652 births
1712 deaths
Clergy from Vienna